Qishi may refer to:

 Qishi, Dongguan, Guangdong, China, a town
 BAW Qishi, a 2009–2014 Chinese compact SUV
 Li Qishi (born 1998), Chinese speed-skater